Tyubyakovo (Töbäk) is a rural locality (a village) in Tukayevsky Selsoviet, Aurgazinsky District, Bashkortostan, Russia. The population was 176 as of 2010. There are 2 streets.

Geography 
Tyubyakovo is located 37 km northwest of Tolbazy (the district's administrative centre) by road. Volkovo is the nearest rural locality.

References 

Rural localities in Aurgazinsky District